Warriors Football Club is a Singaporean professional football club that played in the Singapore Premier League, the top division of football in Singapore. Before changing their name on 20 January 2013, they were previously known as the Singapore Armed Forces Football Club (SAFFC) since their establishment on 16 February 1996. Despite their name back then, not all players from the team came from the Armed Forces. Some were internationals and others were foreign.

The club's original choice of mascot was a wolf, but club officials chose a rhinoceros, which represents discipline, spirit, courage and teamwork.

The Warriors are currently the most successful club in the history of the S.League since its inception, having won the title a record nine times in 1997, 1998, 2000, 2002, 2006, 2007, 2008, 2009 and 2014 and finishing second on four occasions in 1996, 1999, 2001 and 2005.

The Warriors were based at the Jurong Stadium until 2000, before moving to the Choa Chu Kang Stadium in 2001. Before the 2015 SEA Games, they had to vacate Choa Chu Kang and instead played their home matches at the Woodlands Stadium for the 2015 season instead. In 2019, they moved to the Jurong East Stadium, sharing their home with Albirex Niigata Singapore FC.

History

1975–2006
The Singapore Armed Forces Sports Association (SAFSA) football team was formed in 1975 to provide talented footballers serving National Service with opportunities to play competitive football. That year, they won the President's Cup, a feat that they repeated in 1978, when they also captured the National Football League title to complete double. Their Under-19 team won the national Under-19 title in 1979, 1980 and 1983, while the 1981 season of the National Football League saw the SAFSA emerge as unbeaten champions. The President's Cup was won by them again in 1984 and 1986, the latter time as part of a second double, as they also won the National Football League on goal difference. In 1990, the Pools Cup went to the SAFSA and their convincing displays led to their selection as one of eight clubs to compete in the newly formed S.League.

Singapore Armed Forces FC's entry into the S.League in 1996 also resulted in the withdrawal of SAFSA from the National Football League. SAFSA would not participate in Singaporean football leagues again until 1999, when they rejoined the league.

SAFFC finished second in 1996 and 1999 and won the league in 1997 and 1998.

Former Singapore international Fandi Ahmad took over from Mladen Pralija in 1999.

Three coaches were at the reins during this period, each lasting only one season. SAFFC finished second in 2005 but otherwise outside the top two.

2006–2012

Richard Bok took over as SAFFC's head coach in 2006 and led them to four consecutive championships from 2006 to 2009.

In 2008, SAFFC became the first Singaporean club to achieve a back-to-back domestic double, after winning both the S.League and the Singapore Cup in 2007 and 2008. A year later, they qualified for the AFC Champions League by defeating Thai champions PEA FC and PSMS Medan of Indonesia in the Eastern zone play-offs, becoming Singapore's first-ever representative at the highest club competition in Asia.

SAFFC were drawn in a group with J.League champions Kashima Antlers, K League champions Suwon Samsung Bluewings and Chinese Super League runners-up Shanghai Shenhua. They lost all of their matches, except for a 1–1 draw against Shanghai Shenhua at home.

In 2010, SAFFC qualified for their second consecutive AFC Champions League by registering a 3–0 home win against Sriwijaya F.C. of Indonesia and defeated Muangthong United F.C. of Thailand in the Eastern zone play-off final, again at home. Against Henan Jianye of China in the group stage, they drew in the two teams' first encounter and won the return leg 2–1 in Singapore, finishing third in a group that also contained familiar rivals Suwon Samsung Bluewings and former champions Gamba Osaka.

2013–present
On 20 January 2013, SAFFC announced that they had changed their name to Warriors Football Club ahead of the 2013 S.League season.

Alex Weaver, in his first full season as coach of Warriors FC, clinched the 2014 S.League title on the last day of the competition for the Warriors. With DPMM FC of Brunei leading the table until the last day, the Warriors scored a 1–0 win over Albirex Niigata Singapore FC and received a favour from Tampines Rovers, who beat DPMM 2–1 to hand Warriors FC their first title in 5 years and their 9th title in the league's 19-year history.

However, good times did not last for the Warriors. In November 2019, the team were brought to court and charged with 107 counts of not paying salaries for their staff. In total, they failed to pay more than S$350,000 in salaries to about 30 employees, including players, coaches and supporting staff.

2 days after the incident was reported, ST reported that there were 2 parties that were interested to take over Warriors FC.

On 31 December 2019, the FAS had instructed the Warriors to sit out the 2020 Singapore Premier League season due to their financial and legal issues. They applied to return to the Singapore Premier League and Singapore Cup competitions for 2021 to no avail.

Seasons

 The 1996 season of the S.League was split into two series. Tiger Beer Series winners Geylang United defeated Pioneer Series winners Singapore Armed Forces in the championship play-off to clinch the S.League title.
 2003 saw the introduction of penalty shoot-outs if a match ended in a draw in regular time. Winners of penalty shoot-outs won two points instead of one.

Performance in AFC competitions
 AFC Champions League: 3 appearances
2009: Group stage
2010: Group stage
2015: Second qualifying round
 Asian Club Championship: 3 appearances
1999: First round
2000: Second round
2002: First round
AFC Cup: 4 appearances
2007: Quarter-finals
2008: Quarter-finals
2013: Group stage
2015: Group stage
AFC Cup Winners Cup: 2 appearances
1998: Second round
2001: First round

AFC clubs ranking

Player of the Year Award

Top scorers

* Mirko Grabovac was naturalised from 2002 until he renounced his Singaporean citizenship in 2008.

* Aleksandar Đurić was naturalised since 2007.

References

External links
 Official club website
 S.League website page on Warriors FC
 Joma

 
Football clubs in Singapore
Military of Singapore
Association football clubs established in 1975
1975 establishments in Singapore
Singapore Premier League clubs
Military association football clubs in Singapore